Giancarlo Bergamelli (born 28 October 1974) is a retired Italian alpine skier who competed in the 2002 Winter Olympics.

The four Bergamelli ski brothers
The Bergamellis were four brothers, Sergio (born 1970), Norman (born 1971), Thomas (born 1973) and Giancarlo (born 1974), and all four were World Cup alpine skiers.

References

External links
 

1974 births
Living people
Italian male alpine skiers
Olympic alpine skiers of Italy
Alpine skiers at the 2002 Winter Olympics
Alpine skiers of Fiamme Gialle
Sportspeople from the Province of Bergamo
Italian alpine skiing coaches